Erind is a village in the Gjirokastër County, southern Albania. It belongs to the former Lunxhëri municipality and is part of the wider Lunxhëri region. At the 2015 local government reform it became part of the municipality Gjirokastër.

Erind was one of the Albanian Christian villages in the possession of the House of Moutzohoussates, the ancestral house of Ali Pasha.

Notable people 
 Misto Mame
 Sofia Noti
 Petro Poga

References 

Populated places in Gjirokastër
Villages in Gjirokastër County